Birmingham All Saints was a parliamentary constituency in the city of Birmingham, which returned one Member of Parliament (MP) to the House of Commons of the Parliament of the United Kingdom. Elections were held using the first-past-the-post voting system.

The constituency was created in 1955 and abolished in 1974.

Boundaries 
The County Borough of Birmingham wards of All Saints', Rotton Park, and Soho.

Before this seat's creation in 1955 the area (part of the city of Birmingham in the geographic county of Warwickshire) was divided between Birmingham Ladywood (All Saints and Rotton Park wards) and Birmingham Handsworth (Soho ward).

The seat was located in the west of the central part of the city, within its boundaries in 1955. To the west was Smethwick, to the north Birmingham Handsworth, to the east Birmingham Ladywood and to the south Birmingham Edgbaston.

In the 1974 redistribution, this constituency disappeared. The three wards which had comprised the seat were added to Ladywood ward to form the redrawn Birmingham Ladywood constituency; this seat's last MP, Labour's Brian Walden, contested and won the new Ladywood seat.

Members of Parliament

Elections in the 1950s

Elections in the 1960s

Elections in the 1970s

See also
List of former United Kingdom Parliament constituencies

References 

 Boundaries of Parliamentary Constituencies 1885-1972, compiled and edited by F.W.S. Craig (Parliamentary Reference Publications 1972)
 British Parliamentary Election Results 1950-1973, compiled and edited by F.W.S. Craig (Parliamentary Research Services 1983)
 Who's Who of British Members of Parliament, Volume IV 1945-1979, edited by M. Stenton and S. Lees (Harvester Press 1981)
 

Parliamentary constituencies in Birmingham, West Midlands (historic)
Politics of Warwickshire
Constituencies of the Parliament of the United Kingdom established in 1955
Constituencies of the Parliament of the United Kingdom disestablished in 1974